Hartley railway station served the villages of New Hartley and Hartley in Northumberland, North East England from 1851 to 1964.

History 
The station had platforms on both lines, with two curved platforms on the main line and a single platform on the down (northbound) track of the Avenue branch. The principal goods handled at the station were gravel and sand; this ceased in December 1963. The station closed to passengers on 2 November 1964.

References

External links 

Disused railway stations in Northumberland
Former North Eastern Railway (UK) stations
Railway stations in Great Britain opened in 1851
Railway stations in Great Britain closed in 1964
1851 establishments in England
1964 disestablishments in England
Beeching closures in England